Trasaghis (local ) is a comune (municipality) in the Province of Udine in the Italian region Friuli-Venezia Giulia, located about  northwest of Trieste and about  northwest of Udine.

Trasaghis borders the following municipalities: Bordano, Cavazzo Carnico, Forgaria nel Friuli, Gemona del Friuli, Osoppo, Vito d'Asio.

References

External links
  Official website

Cities and towns in Friuli-Venezia Giulia